Yevhen Vasilevich Neronovych (1888—25 March 1918) was Ukrainian politician, Bolshevik activist, member of the Ukrainian People's Republic of Soviet government.

Biography
Neronovych was born in Pyriatyn, in the Poltava Governorate of the Russian Empire. He studied in Saint Petersburg. In 1913 he was a chief editor of the Ukrainian student chronicles in Saint Petersburg. Neronovych at first was a member of the Ukrainian Social Democratic Labour Party (USDRP), later heading the left faction of the party which program was the creation of the independent Soviet Ukraine. In 1917-1918 he was member of the Central Rada and Mala Rada. On November 2, 1917 he was a speaker at the All-Ukrainian Military Congress that took place in Kiev from November 2 through November 8, 1917. The members of the congress were taken by a complete surprise when they found out about the October Revolution. The next day after the session of the congress elapsed the local Bolshevik's faction raised a revolt in Kiev similar to that of Petrograd.

In 1918 Neronovych joined the Bolsheviks. He was given a government portfolio in the Ministry of Military Affairs in March 1918 along with Yuriy Kotsiubynsky and Vladimir Antonov-Ovseyenko as a part of the Ministry triumvirate, an analog of the Russian in the Lenin's sovnarkom. By end of March he resigned for undeclared reasons.

25 March 1918 he was executed by the Ukrainian military forces as the member of the Soviet government in the town of Velyki Sorochyntsi, near Poltava.

Legacy
Even though his contributions do not seem to be impressive he left a non-forgettable legacy behind him as several streets of different cities in Ukraine were renamed in his name after the Civil war period: Kiev, Kamyanets-Podilsky, Hadiach among the few. The city of Velyki Sorochyntsi, the birthplace of Mykola Hohol, was called Neronovychi in 1925–1931.

References

External links
 Great people of Pyriatyn 

1888 births
1918 deaths
People from Pyriatyn
People from Piryatinsky Uyezd
Ukrainian Social Democratic Labour Party politicians
Russian Social Democratic Labour Party members
Bolsheviks
Members of the Central Council of Ukraine
Soviet interior ministers of Ukraine
Soviet defence ministers of Ukraine
Saint Petersburg State Institute of Technology alumni
Ukrainian defectors
People executed by Ukraine
Executed Ukrainian people